George Earle Chamberlain (1854–1928) was a U.S. Senator from Oregon from 1909 to 1921. Senator Chamberlain may also refer to:

Calvin T. Chamberlain (1795–1878), New York State Senate
E. Kirby Chamberlain (fl. 1840s–1850s), California State Senate
George Henry Chamberlain (1862–1943), Ohio State Senate
Mellen Chamberlain (1821–1900), Massachusetts State Senate
Roger Chamberlain (born 1963), Minnesota State Senate
Robert P. Chamberlin (born 1965), Mississippi State Senate